This is a list of Goldsmiths College people, including office holders, current and former academics, and alumni of the Goldsmiths, University of London.

An alumnus is a former student or pupil of a school, college, or university. Commonly, but not always, the word refers to a graduate of the educational institute in question.

Goldsmiths College academics
Current and former academics, with their most senior appointment held shown

 Joan Anim-Addo, Professor of Caribbean Literature and Culture
 Chris Baldick, Professor of English
 Ros Barber, Lecturer in Creative and Life Writing
 Petronella Breinburg, former Senior Lecturer and head of Caribbean Centre
 Cyril Edwards, Senior Lecturer in German
 Chris French, Professor of Psychology
 Stanley Glasser, Professor of Music
 David Graeber, Reader in Social Anthropology 
 Keith Hart, Professor of Anthropology
 Gerard Hemsworth, former Director of the MFA Fine Art Program
 Margot Heinemann, former Professor of English
 Constance Howard, former embroidery lecturer 
 Alexander Ivashkin, Professor of Music
 Scott Lash, Professor of Sociology and Cultural Studies 
 Adam Mars-Jones, Professor of Creative Writing
 Angela McRobbie, Professor of Communications
 Heidi Safia Mirza, Visiting Professor of Race, Faith and Culture 
 Blake Morrison, Professor of Creative and Life Writing 
 Saul Newman, Professor of Political Theory 
 Michael Rosen, Professor of Children's Literature
 Irit Rogoff, Professor of Visual Cultures
 Deirdre Osborne, Reader in English Literature and Drama, co-convenor MA in Black British Writing
 Nirmal Puwar, Reader in Sociology
 John Wood, Professor of Design
 Nigel Guenole, Professor of Occupational Psychology
 George Musgrave

Goldsmiths College alumni

A
Damon Albarn
Rachel Aldred
John Allum
Felix Alvarez
Edith Alice Andrews
Arndís Þórarinsdóttir
Leonard Appelbee
Athanasios Argianas
Knut Åsdam
John Austin (politician)

B
Katy B
Les Back
Rob da Bank
Fiona Banner
Princess Beatrice of York
Chris Beckett
Bernd Behr
Kristyan Benedict
Johanna Bennett
Henry Berry (politician)
Jennifer Otter Bickerdike
Vivien Blackett
Audrey Blackman  
James Blake (musician)
Kathrin Böhm
Henry Bond
Emily Booth
Martyn Brabbins
Philippe Bradshaw
Pablo Bronstein
Will Brooker
Alexander Brown (director)
Moira Buffini
Angela Bulloch
Bill Burns (artist)
Paul Bush

C
Esther Cailingold
Lucy Caldwell
John Cale
Brycchan Carey
Ajay Chabra
Jack Chalker
Eddie Chambers (writer and artist)
Suki Chan
Lawrence Chandler
Liam Charles
Nelson Chia
Adam Chodzko
Julian Clary
Helen Clifton
Ernest A. Cole
Matthew Collings
Stephan Collishaw
Paule Constable
Quilla Constance
A. G. Cook
Jean Cooke
Eileen Cooper
Jessica Cooper
Corrie Corfield
Chris Corner
Stéphane Cornicard
Laura Coryton
Graham Coxon
John Craxton
Helen Cross (author)
Stephen Crowe (composer)
Esmé Currey
Blue Curry

D
Ely Dagher
Paul Daly
Siobhan Daly
Lance Dann
Paul Dash
Ian Davenport
Grenville Davey
Michael Dean
Kirsty Dillon
John Doubleday
Paul Drury
Joyce Dunbar

E
Geoffrey Eastop
Emily Eavis
Ken Edwards
Charles Ejogo
Wade Elliott
Sarah Emerson
Edward Enninful
Ben Enwonwu
Bernardine Evaristo
Roberta Everett

F
Angus Fairhurst
John William Fletcher
Ceal Floyer
James Robert Ford
Michael Ford
Iain Forsyth and Jane Pollard
William Fox-Pitt
Susannah Frankel
Lucian Freud
Nick Fudge

G
Simon Gales
Anya Gallaccio
Susan Gamble
Assaf Gavron
Sue Gee
Sarah Gillespie
Liam Gillick
Alan Gilmour
Goldierocks
Eileen Greenwood
Antony Gormley
Niven Govinden
Peter Graham (composer)
Frances Grey (actress)
Brian Griffiths
Vaughan Grylls
Claudio Guarino
Þórhallur Gunnarsson

H
Robin Haigh
Simon Hale
Ellie Harrison (artist)
John Harvey (author)
Marcus Harvey
Owen Hatherley
Max Hattler
Jacqui Hawkins
Norman Hepple
Cecil Higgs
Rowland Hilder
Bader Ben Hirsi
Damien Hirst
C. Walter Hodges
Robert Hodgins
Pete Hoida
Andy Holden (artist)
Alex Horne
Rachel Howard
Huang Ching-yin
Des Hughes (artist)
Gary Hume

I
John Illsley
Tom Ingleby
Neil Innes
Albert Irvin

J
Alex James (musician)
Cathy Jamieson
Rose Jang
Yuan Chai and Jian Jun Xi
Aowen Jin
Darren Johnson
Linton Kwesi Johnson
Sarah Jones (artist)
Anthony Joseph
Tessa Jowell
Laurence Juber 
Gerry Judah

K
Marion Kalmus
Emma Kay
Dennis Kelly
Jill Kemp
Ingrid Kerma
Kanya King
Gabriele Koch
Kalki Koechlin
Aleksander Kolkowski
Tadeusz Kościński
Shay Kun

L
George Lambourn
Walter Landor
Michael Landy
Abigail Lane
Malcolm Laycock
CN Lester
John Lewis (typographer)
Simon Lewis
Angela Little (academic)
Peter Lowe (artist)
Gus Lobban
Sarah Lucas
Lisa Lynch

M
David McCalden
Kerry McCarthy
Mark McGowan (performance artist)
Ian Mackenzie-Kerr
Malcolm McLaren
Wendy McMurdo
Steve McQueen (director)
Tom MacRae
Fiona Mactaggart
Goshka Macuga
Martin Maloney
John Maltby
Mary Martin (artist)
Hisham Matar
Chris Meigh-Andrews
Kobena Mercer
Joseph Mercier
Lala Meredith-Vula
Maria Minerva
Gladys Mitchell
Maggie Mitchell
Moko (singer)
Brian Molko
Cathy de Monchaux
Ian Monroe
Gareth Morgan (painter)
Gwenda Morgan
Stephen Morgan (MP)
Frances Morrell
Paul Morrison (artist)
Olive Mudie-Cooke
Dave Myers (British chef)

N
Joanna Nadin
Yvonne Ndege
Virginia Nimarkoh
Geoff Norcott

O
Mairead O'hEocha
David Olshanetsky
Donna Ong
Julian Opie
Roy Oxlade

P
Suzanne Packer
Stephen Park
Molly Parkin
Richard Patterson (artist)
Simon Patterson (artist)
Alicia Paz
Nick Petford
Inigo Philbrick
Mike Phillips (writer)
Dame Erica Pienaar
Andrew Poppy
Cyril Power
Alison Prince

Q
Mary Quant

R
Fiona Rae
Shama Rahman
Alessandro Raho
Ross Raisin
Alan Rankle
Nabil Abdul Rashid
Merlyn Rees
Ken Reid (comedian)
Phyl Rendell
Ray Richardson
Ian Rickson
Bridget Riley
Tommy Roberts (designer)
Amy Robbins
Stephen Robson (artist)
Ellen Rogers

S
Amy Sackville
Diane Samuels
San Win
Sarah Sands
Peter Schmidt (artist)
Mark Sealy
Lindsay Seers
Hilda Selwyn-Clarke
Yinka Shonibare
Keir Simmons
Chris Skudder
Simon Slater
Gabriel Sleath
Gordon Slynn
Anj Smith
Bob and Roberta Smith
Bridget Smith
Peter Snow (artist)
Kenneth Spring
Patric Standford
Fergal Stapleton
Jemima Stehli
Emma Stibbon
Tena Štivičić
Matthew Strachan
Rebecca Strickson
Graham Sutherland

T
Tang Da Wu
Tang Ying Chi
Robin Tanner
David Tattersall
Benedict Taylor (musician)
Sam Taylor-Wood
Kae Tempest
Shirley Thompson (composer)
David Thorpe (artist)
Pádraig Timoney
Christine Tobin
James Tomalin
Thomas Trevor (curator)
Nobuko Tsuchiya
Julian Turner

U
R. J. Unstead

V
John Vinelott
Richard Von White

W
Sarah Walker (music broadcaster)
Errollyn Wallen
Dayne Walling
Mark Wallinger
Amelia Warner
Huw Warren
Katherine Weare
Gillian Wearing
Carel Weight
Denton Welch
Mary White (ceramicist and calligrapher)
Roger Williams (organist)
Jane and Louise Wilson
Beatie Wolfe
Clare Woods (artist)
Laila Woozeer
John Worsley (artist)
Ian Wright (illustrator)
Evie Wyld

X
Maria X
Jian Jun Xi

Y
Catherine Yass

Z
Alex Zane
Lijia Zhang

List of Wardens of Goldsmiths
The head of Goldsmiths is known as the Warden.

 1905–1915: William Loring; first warden, killed in action during the First World War
 1915–1927: Thomas Raymont (1915–1919, Acting Warden)
 1927–1950: Arthur Edis Dean
 1950–1953: Aubrey Joseph Price
 1953: Clive Gardiner  (Acting Warden)
 1953–1974: Sir Ross Chesterman
 1974–1975: Francis Michael Glenn Wilson
 1975: Cyril Wallington Green (Acting Warden)
 1976–1984: Richard Hoggart
 1984–1992: Andrew Rutherford
 1992–1998: Ken Gregory
 1998–2004: Ben Pimlott
 2005-2010: Geoffrey Crossick
 2010–2019: Pat Loughrey
 2019–present: Frances Corner

References

Goldsmiths College
Goldsmiths, University of London